Vivaro Romano is a comune (municipality) in the Metropolitan City of Rome in the Italian region Lazio, located about  northeast of Rome.

Vivaro Romano borders the following municipalities: Carsoli, Oricola, Orvinio, Pozzaglia Sabina, Turania, Vallinfreda. Sights include the parish church of San Biagio, the sanctuary of Santa Maria Illuminata and remains of a castle.

References

Cities and towns in Lazio